Move Your Domain Day is an annual observance encouraging owners of domain names to transfer their domain registration away from registrars that supported the Stop Online Piracy Act (SOPA). It was first held on 29 December 2011, the idea coming from a post on Reddit as a protest against prominent registrar GoDaddy's support for SOPA. In 2012, rival registrar Namecheap began an initiative to make Move Your Domain Day an annual event. Subsequent events were held on 22 January 2013, 5 February 2014, and 27 January 2015. The Electronic Frontier Foundation, Reddit, and domain registrars Name.com and Hover have also participated. Namecheap has defined the initiative as "an annual protest and a commemoration of sorts that will continue to shine a light on the issue of a free and open internet."

Origins 
The movement likely originated from a post made on Reddit on 22 December 2011, when a user stated that he would be moving 51 domains away from GoDaddy, and recommended others to do the same.  The thread received significant attention from the Reddit community, gaining over 37,000 up votes from users (but also over 32,000 down votes) in favor of the initiative and many comments criticizing GoDaddy's support of the measure. Notable examples of the backlash against GoDaddy include Ben Huh, CEO of the Cheezburger Network, who threatened to transfer over one thousand domains away from GoDaddy, and Wikimedia Foundation, the nonprofit company behind many websites including Wikipedia, which decided to move all its domains away from GoDaddy. In response to the backlash, numerous domain registrars offered coupons for discounted domain transfers, while also offering to donate a portion of profits to the EFF. GoDaddy itself changed its stance on SOPA in the days prior to 29 December in an attempt to minimize damage.

Reports up to 29 December described GoDaddy as "hemorrhaging" customers. On 25 December 2011 (Christmas Day), GoDaddy lost a net 16,191 domains, mostly as a result of the boycott. However, on 29 December itself, GoDaddy gained a net of 20,748 domains, twice as many as it lost that day, attributed by Techdirt to a number of causes, in particular customers having moved early, and an appeased customer response to their change of position over SOPA.

2013 event 
In 2012, Namecheap relaunched the initiative and set the date for the second Move Your Domain Day as 22 January 2013.  On that day, Namecheap has announced that domain transfers will be greatly discounted, and between $0.50 and $1.50 per domain transferred will be donated to the Electronic Frontier Foundation (depending on the total number of transfers). In response to this announcement, Shari Steele, the executive director of the Electronic Frontier Foundation, stated that "EFF is pleased to join Namecheap in celebrating digital rights within the greater the Internet community. The funds donated from the moveyourdomainday effort will ensure EFF can continue to fight for free expression for Internet users worldwide."

2014 event 
On 5 February 2014, each  .com, .net, .org, .info and .biz domains is $3.98, up to 50 domain transfer per account, only domain that's not have been transferred out from Namecheap can qualify. Donation were also given to EFF.

See also 
 Black World Wide Web protest
 Electronic Frontier Foundation
 Grassroots
 Internet activism
 List of organizations with official stances on the SOPA and PIPA
 Protests against SOPA and PIPA

References 

History of the Internet
Internet-based activism
Internet-related activism
Internet censorship
2012 protests
2012 in the United States
Politics and technology
Political controversies in the United States
Annual protests